"Can't Raise a Man" is a song by American R&B singer K. Michelle released on January 13, 2014. It is the second single from her debut studio album Rebellious Soul. Produced by Bridgetown, Troy Taylor, and Ezekiel Lewis, and written by Taylor, Lewis, Menardini Timothee, and Najja McDowell.

Chart performance
On February 14, 2014, the song peaked at number 94 on the US Billboard Hot 100 chart, number 23 on the Hot R&B/Hip-Hop Songs chart, number 12 on the Heatseekers Songs chart and number 19 on the R&B Streaming Songs.

On April 5, 2014, the song peaked at number 30 on the US Billboard Adult R&B Songs chart and number 13 on US Billboard Hot R&B Songs. On April 19, 2014 the song peaked at number 13 on US Billboard R&B/Hip-Hop Airplay,

Music video
The music video for the song was released on February 7, 2014 via YouTube and was directed by Benny Boom. It was shot at Great Falls (Passaic River) in Paterson, New Jersey.

Charts

Weekly charts

Year-end charts

Certifications

References

K. Michelle songs
2012 singles
2012 songs
Atlantic Records singles
Songs written by Ezekiel Lewis
Music videos directed by Benny Boom
Song recordings produced by Troy Taylor (record producer)
Songs written by Troy Taylor (record producer)
Songs written by K. Michelle